Movement - Japa is a Nigerian Television series written by Bode Asiyanbi and produced by Femi Odugbemi. The series is Centred mainly on the lives of Nigerian youths who were forced to marking critical and bad decisions due to challenges from the society.

Synopsis 
The series is about three friends who are in search of a better life but due to the challenges they faced the made bad decision and resulted to criminal acts.

Premiere 
The television show was premiere on November 1st 2021 by the production company Zuri 24 Media and African Magic of Multichoice Nigeria.

Casts and crew

Crew 

 Femi Odugbemi - Executive producer
 Lanre Olupona - Director 
 Bode Asiyanbi - Writer
 Yemi Jolaoso - Editor
 Agbo  Kelly - Cinematographer

Casts 

 Chioma Agwunobi as Dr colette
 Chris Iheuwa as Uncle Wille
 Ese Hammond  as Ama
 Valerie Dish as Angela
 Adjetey Anang as Black Arrow
 Sambasa Nzeribe as Osas
 Gideon Okeke
 Sola Onayiga
 Okawa Shanznay  as Mimi

References